Jonathan Kingdon (born 1935 in Tanzania) is a zoologist, science author, and artist; a research associate at the University of Oxford.

He focuses on taxonomic illustration and evolution of the mammals of Africa. He is a contributor to The Oxford Book of Modern Science Writing. He was awarded the 1993 Silver Medal of the Zoological Society of London, and was awarded the Royal Geographical Society's Cherry Kearton Medal and Award in 1998.

Books

References

Living people
British zoologists
British science writers
1935 births